is the music associated with the Okinawa Islands of southwestern Japan. In modern Japan, it may also refer to the musical traditions of Okinawa Prefecture, which covers the Miyako and Yaeyama Islands in addition to the Okinawa Islands. It has its roots in the larger musical traditions of the Southern Islands.

Genres
A dichotomy widely accepted by Okinawan people is the separation of musical traditions into koten (classical) and min'yō (folk). Okinawa was once ruled by the highly centralized kingdom of Ryūkyū. The samurai class in the capital of Shuri developed its high culture while they frequently suppressed folk culture in rural areas. Musicologist Susumu Kumada added another category, "popular music", to describe songs that emerged after the kingdom was abolished in 1879.

Classical music

 was the court music of Ryūkyū.  was the traditional chamber music of the royal palace at Shuri Castle. It was performed by the bureaucrats as official duties.

The texture is essentially heterophonic using a single melodic line. Pitched accompaniment instruments each play a simultaneous variation on the vocal line.

Folk music
Traditionally seen as "low culture" by the samurai class, folk music gained positive evaluation with the rise of folkloristics led by Yanagita Kunio. Folk music is described by the Japanese term min'yō. Since the kingdom was abolished, some members of the former samurai class spread Shuri-based high culture to other areas of Okinawa. Some of such new elements are today seen as part of folk culture.

Okinawa's folk songs are generally accompanied by one (or more) sanshin.

The suffixes -ondo and -bushi (both meaning "song" or "melody") may also be attached to the title of folk songs, however songs named without these clarifiers are more common. Eisā and kachāshī are Okinawan dances with specific music styles that accompany them.

Warabi uta
 is a general term for nursery rhymes and children's songs.

Popular music

New folk songs
, composed in the style of traditional Okinawan min'yō, have been written by several contemporary Okinawan folk musicians such as Rinshō Kadekaru, Sadao China, Shoukichi Kina, Seijin Noborikawa, and Tsuneo Fukuhara. These songs are often heard in contemporary pop music arrangements. , with music and lyrics by Shōkichi Kina, is typical of this genre.

Okinawa's (new) folk songs are sometimes referred to as shima-uta. The term is not native to Okinawa but was borrowed from its northern neighbor, the Amami Islands, in the 1970s. The application of the term to Okinawan music is disfavored by people who see shima-uta as a regional brand of the Amami Islands.

Okinawa pop
The music of Okinawa came under the influence of American rock music beginning with the end of World War II. Many musicians began to blend the Okinawan folk music style and native instruments with those of American popular and rock music. This is called "Uchinaa pop". One example is Ryukyu Underground, who combine both classical and folk music with modern Dub music.

Instrumentation
The instrument that defines Okinawan music is the sanshin (shamisen). It is a three-stringed lute, very similar to the Chinese sanxian and a precursor to the Japanese shamisen. The body is covered in snake skin and it is plucked with a plectrum worn on the index finger.

Pārankū, a small hand-held drum about the size of a tambourine, is often used in eisā dancing.

Sanba are three small, flat pieces of wood or plastic that are used to make rapid clicking sounds, similar to castanets. Yotsutake are two sets of rectangular bamboo strips tied together, one set held in each hand, clapped together on the strong beat of the music. Traditionally they have been used in classical music, but recently they have been used in eisā dancing.

A group of singers called a  often accompanies folk music, singing the chorus or interjecting shouts called . Also finger whistling called  is common in kachāshī and eisā dance tunes.

Additional instruments are often used in classical music, and sometimes incorporated in folk music: 
  – an Okinawan version of the koto; often called  or 
  – an Okinawan version of the kokyū
  – an Okinawan transverse flute; also called fansō (ファンソー) or

Tonality
The following is described in terms used in Western disciplines of music.

Music from Okinawa uses tonal structure that is different in music from mainland Japan and Amami in particular the intervalic content of the scales used.

The chief pentatonic scale used in mainland Japan, for example, uses scale degrees 1, 2, 3, 5, and 6, also known as Do, Re, Mi, So, and La in the Kodály system of solfeggio. This structure avoids half step intervals by eliminating the fourth and seventh scale degrees.

In contrast, music from Okinawa is abundant in the half steps. Common structures used in Okinawan music are a pentatonic scale utilizing scale degrees 1, 3, 4, 5, 7, or Do, Mi, Fa, So, Ti, or a hexatonic scale with the addition of the second scale degree, 1, 2, 3, 4, 5, 7, or Do, Re, Mi, Fa, So, Ti. Half steps occur between the third and fourth (Mi and Fa), and also the seventh and first (Ti and Do) scale degrees. In particular, the interval from 7 to 1, or Ti to Do is very common. A folk tune can often be recognized as being Okinawan by noting the presence of this interval.

Notable Okinawan songs

Okinawan musicians and musical ensembles

Traditional (Classical/Koten Ongaku)
  Choichi Terukina -Living National Treasure 
  Kishun Nishie -Living National Treasure

Traditional (Folk/Min'yô)
 Sadao China
 Rinshō Kadekaru
 Misako Koja
 Nēnēs
 Seijin Noborikawa
 Misako Oshiro

Pop
 The Boom – rock band from Yamanashi Prefecture, known for the song Shima Uta
 Cocco
 High and Mighty Color
 HY
 Shoukichi Kina & Champloose
 Mongol800
 Rimi Natsukawa
 Orange Range
 Rinken Band
 Ryukyu Underground - A duo fusing traditional Okinawan music with Electronica genres such as Dub.
 DA PUMP
 Fuzzy Control
 RYUU-unit
 Ryukyudisko
 Fujiko Shuri

Media

References

External links
 Chicago Okinawa Kenjinkai: Okinawan Music – audio selections